Arkadiusz Kułynycz (born 26 December 1992) is a Polish Greco-Roman wrestler. He won one of the bronze medals in the 87 kg event at the 2021 World Wrestling Championships held in Oslo, Norway.

He represented Poland at the 2019 European Games in Minsk, Belarus and he won one of the bronze medals in the 87 kg event.

Achievements

References

External links 
 

Living people
1992 births
Place of birth missing (living people)
Polish male sport wrestlers
Wrestlers at the 2019 European Games
European Games bronze medalists for Poland
European Games medalists in wrestling
World Wrestling Championships medalists